Ampelaster is a North American monotypic genus of flowering plants in the family Asteraceae. There is a single known species, Ampelaster carolinianus, with the common name of climbing aster. It is native to the southeastern United States, in the States of Florida, Georgia, North Carolina, and South Carolina.

Ampelaster carolinianus is unusual in the family in that it is a climber, using other plants to support its weight. Sometimes it uses adventitious roots to this end. Flower heads are 1–15 per branch, with both ray florets and disc florets, the flowers pale pink to rose-purple.

Citations

References

External links

Lady Bird Johnson Wildflower Center, University of Texas
eNature field guide, Climbing Aster Ampelaster carolinianus (Aster carolinianus)
University of Waterloo (Canada), Ampelaster The Climbing Aster
JC Raulston Arboretum at North Carolina State University

Astereae
Monotypic Asteraceae genera
Flora of the Southeastern United States